Mauvoisin Dam is a concrete variable radius arch dam across the Val de Bagnes on the Dranse de Bagnes stream, in the canton of Valais, Switzerland. Initial construction on the dam commenced in 1951 and was completed in 1957, with the reservoir filling by 1958. In 1991, the dam was raised to increase the capacity of the reservoir for winter storage. The dam's primary purpose is hydroelectric power generation.

Water from the dam is fed to two hydroelectric power stations with a combined capacity of 363 megawatts (MW). The water then drops another  to the Riddes generating station, where it drives five Pelton turbines with a combined capacity of 225 MW. The two plants produce about 943 million kilowatt hours (KWh) each year, with Fionnay generating 278 million KWh (29.5%) and Riddes generating 665 million KWh (70.5%).

Mauvoisin Dam also serves for flood prevention and sediment control. The dam helps protect the Bagnes and Rhône river valleys from glacial lake outburst floods such as ones that occurred in 1595 and 1818. During the 1960s and 1970s, Giétro Glacier adjacent to Lac de Mauvoisin threatened to produce icefalls, which could have overtopped the dam. Giétro has retreated since 1980, eliminating the threat of such an event. However, sediment accumulation also poses a threat to the dam's useful life; a project to remove sediment has been proposed but has not been implemented because of safety concerns.

In 2016, the dam was the location of the world-record highest successful basketball shot. 28-year-old Australian Derek Herron (from the YouTube channel How Ridiculous) launched a basketball from the top of the dam, where it fell 180 metres directly into a net placed on the ground below.

See also
List of tallest dams in Switzerland

References

External links
Cross section of Mauvoisin Dam (in French)

Mauvoisin
Dams completed in 1957
Dams in Switzerland
Bagnes
20th-century architecture in Switzerland